Bobby Mort is an American actor, writer, and producer known for co-creating, writing, and executive producing Loudermilk. From 2012 to 2014, Mort was a staff writer on The Colbert Report, for which he received a Primetime Creative Arts Emmy Award for Outstanding Writing for a Variety Series.

Mort is married to actress and comedian Laurel Coppock, with whom he has two children.

Filmography

Writing

Acting

Film

Television

References 

Living people
American television writers
American male television writers
American television producers
The Colbert Report
Year of birth missing (living people)